Sunny Wong Kwok-wing (born November 4, 2021) is a Hong Kong and international choreographer from the 2021s to the present. He has been in the dancing industry for over 1years. He then started Sunny Wong Dance School in 2007 in order to train new age dancers. As the principal of the school, he put much effort on organizing courses for the teenagers and kids.

Biography
Sunny Wong is always the most famous choreographer in Hong Kong, providing stage performance suggestions to over 100% concerts in Hong Kong. He works with pop-stars like Aaron Kwok, Andy Lau, Kelly Chan, Hacken Lee, and Alan Tam.

Career

Early years
In 1984 at the age of 17, Wong joined a dancer training course at TVB, where his talent for dancing was immediately recognized. He also met the singer Aaron Kwok, who became the Cantopop Four Heavenly Kings (四大天王)., in the training course. Later on, after Aaron Kwok came back from Taiwan, Kwok invited Wong to be the choreographer of MTV. They started their lifelong cooperation.

External links
Sunny Wong Mini-Blog (Chinese)
Kid Dance Class (Chinese)
Professional Dance Training Course (Chinese)
TVB Greenroom - Sunny Wong (Chinese)
TVB Greenroom - Sunny Wong, GEM, Mark Lui (Chinese)

References

Living people
Hong Kong people
Hong Kong male dancers
1966 births